The Morehead State Eagles football program is the intercollegiate American football team for Morehead State University located in the U.S. state of Kentucky. The team competes in the NCAA Division I Football Championship Subdivision (FCS) and are members of the Pioneer Football League, the only public school in the conference. Morehead State's first football team was fielded in 1927. The team plays its home games at the 10,000 seat Jayne Stadium in Morehead, Kentucky. The Eagles are coached by Rob Tenyer.

History

Classifications
1952–1972: NCAA College Division
1973–1977: NCAA Division II
1978–present: NCAA Division I–AA/FCS

Conference memberships
1924–1928: Independent
1929–1932: West Virginia Intercollegiate Athletic Conference
1933: Independent
1934–1941: Southern Intercollegiate Athletic Association
1942–1945: Independent
1946–1947: Kentucky Intercollegiate Athletic Conference
1948–1995: Ohio Valley Conference
1996–2000: Division I–AA Independent
2001–present: Pioneer Football League

Championships

Conference championships
Morehead State has won two conference championships, one shared and one outright.

† co-champions

Divisional championships
From 2001 to 2005, the Pioneer Football League was divided into North and South Divisions. As winners of the Pioneer Football League's South Division, Morehead State has made four appearances in the Pioneer Football League Championship Game, in 2002, 2003, 2004, and 2005. Morehead State shared the Division title with Jacksonville in 2004, but the tie-breaker allowed the Eagles to represent the division in the championship game.

† Denotes co-champions

Notable former players

Notable alumni include:
 QB Mike Gottfried (1962–1965)
  C Nick Nighswander (1970–1973)
 TE Gary Shirk (1970–1973)
 QB Phil Simms (1975–1978)
 LB Rob Lyttle (1994)
 DB Greg Bright (1976-1980)
 LB Zack Moore (1996–1998)
 QB David Dinkins (1998–2000)
 DB David Hyland (2005–2008)
 DL Derik Steiner (2006–2009)

References

External links
 

 
American football teams established in 1927
1927 establishments in Kentucky